Asfyj District is in Behabad County, Yazd province, Iran. At the 2006 National Census, its population (as two rural districts of Behabad District in Bafq County) was 3,593 in 1,009 households. The following census in 2011 counted 4,257 people in 1,397 households, by which time Asfyj District had been created within the newly established Behabad County. At the latest census in 2016, the district had 3,829 inhabitants in 1,349 households.

References 

Behabad County

Districts of Yazd Province

Populated places in Yazd Province

Populated places in Behabad County